Komar is a Slavic-language surname literally meaning "mosquito".  Notable people with this surname include:

 Delfina Potocka, née Komar (1807–1877), Polish countess
 Hryhoriy Komar (born 1976), Ukrainian Greek Catholic bishop
 Iris Komar, German swimmer
 Ivan Komar (born 1970), Belarusian athlete
 Jack Komar, American judge
 Juan Komar (born 1986), Argentine footballer
 László Komár (1944–2012), Hungarian singer
 Mateusz Komar (born 1985), Polish cyclist
 Max Komar (born 1987), American football player
 Milan Komar (1921–2006), Slovenian philosopher
 Polina Komar (born 1999), Russian synchronised swimmer
 Rene Komar (born 1977), Croatian footballer
 Sue Palmer-Komar (born 1967), Canadian racing cyclist
 Vitaly Komar (born 1943), Russian graphic artist
  (1909–1972), Polish brigadier general, a victim of the Trial of the Generals
 Władysław Komar (1940–1998), Polish athlete

Fictional characters
Maxim Komar-Myshkin (1978-2011), fictional artist, a project of  Roee Rosen, Israeli artist, writer and filmmaker

See also
 
 Komor (surname)
 Komarov (surname)

Czech-language surnames
Polish-language surnames
Slovak-language surnames
Slovene-language surnames